The Rivalry is an American college football rivalry game played by the Lafayette Leopards football team of Lafayette College and the Lehigh Mountain Hawks football team of Lehigh University. It is the most-played football rivalry in the nation and is the longest uninterrupted rivalry game. As of 2022, "The Rivalry" has been played 158 times since 1884 with only one interruption in 1896. No game was played in calendar 2020 due to COVID-19 issues, but the teams played in April 2021 after the Patriot League, home to both schools, moved its originally planned fall 2020 season to spring 2021. The colleges' football teams met twice annually (except 1891, when they played three games, and 1896, when they did not play at all) until 1901. The two institutions are located seventeen miles apart in the Lehigh Valley in eastern Pennsylvania.

Despite popular belief, Harvard and Yale did not play The Game in four separate years during The Rivalry's streak of 156 consecutive games. Furthermore, Lehigh and Lafayette met twice per season in 1943 and 1944 during World War II. The Rivalry is so old that it predates football trophies; the winning team instead keeps the game ball. These are painted with the score and kept at the winning institution's campus. Lehigh displays its game balls in its athletic hall of fame, and Lafayette keeps its game balls at the official residence of its president. The evolution of the shape of the football can be seen in the displays of past game balls, since the early ones predate even the invention of the forward pass.

The football game is usually sold out months in advance and has inspired books and a PBS television documentary narrated by Harry Kalas. In 2006, ESPNU ranked The Rivalry No. 8 in their Top Ten College Football Rivalries, and Sports Illustrated has told its readers that seeing it "is something you have to do once in your life." In 2018, The Rivalry was ranked among Athlon Sports top 25 rivalries in the history of college football.

The 150th game, on November 22, 2014, was played at Yankee Stadium in The Bronx. The game was broadcast live nationally on CBS Sports Network.

Series history

Early days
Although they did not meet on the football field until 1884, an anecdote from David Bishop Skillman's history of Lafayette College reveals that bad blood existed between the two places even before Lehigh University was founded. When Asa Packer first moved to Mauch Chunk (now Jim Thorpe, Pennsylvania) as an uneducated carpenter, he followed his family's footsteps in joining a local Presbyterian church. However, he did not fit in well with the other more strait-laced members of the congregation, and so he  left and joined an Episcopalian congregation that was more welcoming to him.

One day, after Packer had risen to affluence and before he founded Lehigh University, Ario Pardee, a coal baron from Hazleton, approached Judge Packer in connection with the addition of an engineering wing to Lafayette College. While eager at first in the proposition, Judge Packer's enthusiasm turned sour when Pardee mentioned that the school would be under the control of the Presbyterian Church. Packer let him know that he would have nothing to do with any school run by the Presbyterians. Packer later enlisted the help of the Episcopal Bishop of Philadelphia, William Bacon Stevens, in founding Lehigh University.

First athletic events
Lafayette records indicate that the first athletic meeting between the two schools was a series of baseball games played in Easton and Bethlehem in October 1869. The first game was a 45–45 tie, and Lafayette won the second meeting 31–24.

The first joint athletic track and field event held between the two institutions was on May 14, 1881, on the grounds of  Lehigh University. The meet consisted of fourteen events: a 100-yard dash, a half-mile run, a hammer throw, high jump, 440-yards dash, mile walk, shotput, broad jump, 220-yard dash, mile run, pole vaulting, 120-yard hurdle race, bicycle race, a standing high jump, and tug of war. Lehigh won the event decisively, winning ten of the fourteen events.

As a sign of the intense rivalry that was already developing between the two schools, an article in Lafayette's student newspaper, the Lafayette College Journal, called Lafayette's loss to Lehigh a "defeat in our recent contest with Lehigh University, -a defeat, too, doubly humiliating, coming, as it did, from an adversary in every other respect our inferior."

Early football
Lafayette football began in 1882. The game was closer to rugby back then and even the goals and touchdowns were recorded separately in the scores. After football rules were standardized in 1883, Lafayette's manager Theodore L. Welles approached Lehigh and offered to play them. Lehigh thus formed its first team in 1884, managed by Richard Harding Davis, which gamely played and lost twice to the more experienced Lafayette team.

The Lehigh freshmen were dismayed by the lack of support that the administration showed the team. They thought the rickety stands built for the 1887 event in Bethlehem were a disgrace and set them on fire at the end of the game to celebrate Lehigh's first win. Thus, the tradition of exuberance surrounding the game was started.

Since the start in 1884, only in one season (1896) have the teams not met. Because few schools were playing football at the time and travel was more difficult in the horse and buggy era, Lehigh and Lafayette played each other twice in the early years with each school hosting one of the games. This continued until the development of modern football in 1902, when the current annual game was established.

Only twice have Lafayette and Lehigh played somewhere other than in Easton or Bethlehem. In 1891, the teams played a third game in Wilkes-Barre, before 3,000 spectators. A newspaper report stated: "... by far the largest crowd that ever witnessed a football game in Wilkes-Barre, and the cheering of the students seemed to startle the natives." That was one of three Lafayette-Lehigh games that year; Lehigh won all three. The next meeting outside the Lehigh Valley did not take place until 2014, when the schools played at Yankee Stadium to commemorate the 150th game in the series.

1900s

The Rivalry's football game was postponed only twice during the 20th century. The first postponement occurred in 1904 because of the death of Dr. Henry S. Drown, president of Lehigh and former faculty member at Lafayette. The only other postponement was in 1963 when the game was moved from November 23 to November 30 following the assassination of President John F. Kennedy.

During World War II, the war restricted travel to other opponents and Lehigh was hosting officer training programs which limited sports programs. Thus, to fill out their schedules, the nearby schools played two football games again in 1943 and 1944, with Lehigh students forming ad hoc teams just to keep The Rivalry tradition alive. Between November 1943 and November 1947, Lafayette won six games in a row by a combined score of 193–0, but by the early 1950s Lehigh was winning in lopsided shutouts.

The combination of only missing one year of play since 1884, plus 19 years with two games and one year with three, has led to The Rivalry becoming the most played in college football.

Before 1991, when new rules and game start times were imposed, it was traditional for the fans to tear down the temporary wooden goalposts that the schools erected for the event. The pieces were kept as souvenirs in the fraternities of each school. Eventually, taking down the goalposts got out of hand with students fighting for the torn down goal posts, and with each other, as early as before the third quarter. New rules were implemented for the 1991 game played at Lehigh when H-shaped steel goalposts anchored 10 feet into the ground were first used. The fans who rushed the field were frustrated by the new changes and showed this by tearing up and throwing pieces of sod at the security guards and police who were surrounding the posts. Only one fan actually was able to climb the posts, and when he was pulled down, he was maced and handcuffed.

2000s

Starting in the 2000s, the regular season ending game has often become a factor in deciding the winner of the Patriot League. During the 2004 and 2006 meetings, Lehigh came into Fisher Stadium leading Lafayette by one game. Due to tie breaking rules, the winner of the game would be crowned the League champion. The second runner-up during this period was Colgate University, that had beaten Lafayette or Lehigh that year. Following nine years of consecutive Lehigh victories, Lafayette earned a four-year parade of Lafayette victories from 2004 to 2007 wherein the Lehigh Class of 2008 witnessed no football victory against Lafayette at all. This was then reversed by Lehigh, with Lehigh running a five-year streak from 2008 to 2012, making the Lafayette Classes of 2012 and 2013 winless.  The tide changed in 2013, when, for the first time since 2006, The Rivalry was played with a Patriot League championship on the line. Much like in 2006, the Leopards jumped out to a large lead, fought off a Lehigh rally, and pulled away down the stretch, winning 50-28 and claiming the Patriot League crown outright, this time on their rival's home turf. Quarterback Drew Reed took MVP honors, becoming the first Lafayette freshman in almost 25 years to do so.

150th meeting
The 150th meeting of "The Rivalry" in 2014 took place at the iconic Yankee Stadium in The Bronx. While this was the first neutral-site game in more than a century, Lafayette was the designated home team. The stadium was much larger than either school's regular venue, and likely larger than any venue where all but a tiny number of players from either side would ever play. Each team debuted special uniforms with Lafayette sporting a plain gray jersey, while Lehigh paid tribute to the stadium and usual home team by sporting a pinstripe jersey.

While Lafayette had won the last meeting, and had a slightly better record than their competitor, Lehigh's chances were vastly improved as Lafayette's starting and backup quarterbacks were injured in the previous game and in practice respectively, leaving third string senior Zach Zweizig to lead the team. Lafayette still won, defeating Lehigh 27–7.

COVID-19 postponement 
The game was originally canceled in 2020 for the first time in 124 years due to the COVID-19 pandemic and the cancellation of fall sports by the Patriot League. A decision was later made to move the Patriot League fall 2020 season to spring 2021, thereby allowing the Rivalry to remain uninterrupted in the school calendar year. Lafayette and Lehigh were originally scheduled to play on April 3, but the game was postponed due to COVID-19 issues within the Lafayette program. The teams eventually played on April 10, with Lafayette winning 20–13.

Memorable moments

No game in 1896
The only season, and first calendar year, in which there was no game was 1896, when Lehigh refused to play Lafayette over a dispute about the eligibility of their best running back, George Barclay, who had played professional baseball at Chambersburg, Pennsylvania the previous summer. The question of his eligibility centered around whether Barclay had received more than reimbursement of travel expenses.

Longest run
During a 17–0 Lehigh victory in 1918, it is rumored that Lehigh halfback Raymond B. "Snooks" Dowd ran 115 yards for a touchdown. As Lehigh Athletic Media Relations relate the story, "Dowd ran the wrong way, circled his own goalposts," and then ran the length of the field for the touchdown eluding Lafayette's All-American linebacker Zac "Baker" Howes in the process. Some reports have been exaggerated to credit the length of the run to as much as 160 yards.

Overtime catch
The 1995 game, the first year in which the Patriot League used overtime, was decided in the second overtime session. Following a 30–30 regulation score and a scoreless first possession of overtime, Lehigh wide receiver Brian Klingerman caught a pass with one hand from quarterback Bob Aylsworth in the back of the end zone. The catch not only won the game for Lehigh, which trailed 30–14 midway in the fourth quarter, but led them to clinch the Patriot League championship.

Lafayette's catch
In the 2005 game played at Lehigh, Lafayette backup quarterback Pat Davis threw a 37-yard TD pass to running back Jonathan Hurt on 4th-and-10 with 38 seconds left to give the Leopards a 23–19 win. The victory gave Lafayette the second of three straight Patriot League championships and NCAA I-AA (FCS) Playoff appearances. Davis entered the game after Lafayette starting quarterback Brad Maurer, the MVP of wins in 2004 (24-10) and later 2006 (49-27), was injured on the game's first series.

COVID-19
Due to COVID-19, the 156th Rivalry Game, originally scheduled for November 21, 2020, was canceled. This is the first time since 1896 and after an uninterrupted streak of 124 games that a game had been canceled. After the Patriot League moved its fall 2020 season to spring 2021, the teams were originally scheduled to play on April 3, 2021.  After a one-week postponement due to COVID-19 issues in the Lafayette program, the 156th edition of The Rivalry was played on April 10 at Fisher Stadium in Easton.

Football record

Summary
158 meetings since 1884

Game results

All Sports Trophy
The Rivalry was further cemented by the creation of the "All Sports Trophy" in 1968.  The trophy is held by the school which wins the most varsity sports meetings during a school year.  One point is awarded per victory.  At the year end, points are totaled to determine the overall champion.

All Sports Trophy record

Men's sports
Years won by Lehigh – 34
Years won by Lafayette – 2
Ties – 6
Women's sports
Years won by Lafayette – 12
Years won by Lehigh – 10
Ties – 0

See also  
 List of NCAA college football rivalry games
 List of most-played college football series in NCAA Division I

References

External links
 "Memories of the Rivalry", Lehigh Mountainhawks football, 2006
 Lehigh and Lafayette Are Still Playing After All Those Years - New York Times
  The Lehigh/Lafayette Legacy, PBS, 2004

1884 establishments in Pennsylvania
College football rivalries in the United States
College sports in Pennsylvania
Lafayette Leopards football
Lehigh Mountain Hawks football
Patriot League
Sports in the Lehigh Valley